Thettu is a 1971 Indian Malayalam film, directed by K. S. Sethumadhavan and produced by C. C. Baby. The film stars Sathyan and Sheela in the lead roles. The film had musical score by G. Devarajan.

Cast

Sathyan as Johnny
Sheela as Baby
Kamalam as Ammini
Prema as Lissi
Shobha as Child Artist
T. R. Omana as Thangamma
Baby Sumathi as Mini
Bahadoor as Kochappi
K.P. Ummer as Mathew
Leela as Saramma
Murali
Paravoor Bharathan as Kurian
Philomina as Eli
Sadhana as Kukku
Veeran as Paili

Soundtrack
The music was composed by G. Devarajan and the lyrics were written by Vayalar Ramavarma.

References

External links
 

1971 films
1970s Malayalam-language films
Films directed by K. S. Sethumadhavan